Acoustic panels (also sound absorption panels, soundproof panels or sound panels) are sound-absorbing fabric-wrapped boards designed to control echo and reverberation in a room. Most commonly used to resolve speech intelligibility issues in commercial soundproofing treatments. Most panels are constructed with a wooden frame, filled with sound absorption material (mineral wool, fiber glass, cellulose, open cell foam, or combination of) and wrapped with fabric.

References 

akustik panel

Acoustics